Mitogen-activated protein kinase kinase kinase 9 is an enzyme that in humans is encoded by the MAP3K9 gene.

References

Further reading

External links 
 

EC 2.7.11